In Name and Blood is the third studio album by punk rock band Murder City Devils, released in 2000. It was recorded, produced, and mixed at Robert Lang Studios by John Agnello.

The Fastbacks's Kim Warnick sings backing vocals on "I'll Come Running." The Supersuckers's Ron Heathman plays lead guitar on "Lemuria Rising."

Critical reception
The Austin American-Statesman wrote that "rock doesn't get much uglier than this Johnny Thunders-derived, organ-bleeding Washington state band."

Track listing 

Press Gang	
I Drink The Wine	
Bunkhouse	
Idle Hands	
Rum To Whiskey	
I'll Come Running
Demon Brother	
Lemuria Rising
Somebody Else's Baby	
In This Town	
No Grave But The Sea	
Fields Of Fire

References

2000 albums
Murder City Devils albums
Sub Pop albums
Albums recorded at Robert Lang Studios